Moisés "Moi" Parra Gutiérrez (born 24 June 2002) is a Spanish professional footballer who plays as a left winger for Getafe CF B.

Club career
Born in Huelva, Andalusia, Parra made his senior debut with local side La Palma CF in the División de Honor. In 2020, he moved to Recreativo de Huelva, being initially assigned to the Juvenil squad.

In 2021, Parra signed for Extremadura UD and was initially assigned to the reserves in Tercera División RFEF. The following 26 January, despite appearing with the first team in Primera División RFEF, he left the club as their financial situation worsened, and signed for another reserve team on 5 February 2022, Getafe CF B.

Parra made his first team – and La Liga – debut on 15 August 2022, coming on as a late substitute for Borja Mayoral in a 3–0 home loss against Atlético Madrid.

References

External links

2002 births
Living people
Footballers from Huelva
Spanish footballers
Association football wingers
La Liga players
Primera Federación players
Tercera Federación players
Divisiones Regionales de Fútbol players
Atlético Onubense players
Extremadura UD B players
Extremadura UD footballers
Getafe CF B players
Getafe CF footballers